The 2018–19 Abilene Christian Wildcats women's basketball team represented Abilene Christian University during the 2018–19 NCAA Division I women's basketball season. The Wildcats, led by seventh year head coach Julie Goodenough, played their home games at the Moody Coliseum. They finished the season 23–10, 13–5 in Southland play to finish in fourth place. They won the Southland women's tournament to earn an automatic to the NCAA women's tournament for the first time in school history. They lost in the first round to Baylor.

Previous season
The Wildcats finished the 2017–18 season 16–14, 9–9 in Southland play to finish in seventh place. In  Southland women's tournament play, they defeated New Orleans in the first round.  Their season ended when they lost to Central Arkansas in the tournament quarterfinals.

Roster
Sources:

Schedule
Sources:

|-
!colspan=9 style=";"| Non-conference regular season

|-
!colspan=9 style=| Southland regular season

|-
!colspan=9 style=| Southland Women's Tournament

|-
!colspan=9 style=| NCAA Women's Tournament

See also
2018–19 Abilene Christian Wildcats men's basketball team

References

Abilene Christian Wildcats women's basketball seasons
Abilene Christian
Abilene Christian
Abilene Christian
Abilene